"ATLiens" is the second single from hip hop duo Outkast's second studio album of the same name. It is a double A-Side single, alongside the track "Wheelz of Steel". Both songs were written and produced by OutKast. The song appeared on the FOX series New York Undercover. The single peaked at number 35 on the Billboard Hot 100.

"ATLiens" is widely considered one of Outkast's best songs. In 2020, The Ringer ranked the song number three on their list of the 50 greatest Outkast songs. In 2021, The Guardian ranked the song number eight on their list of the 20 greatest Outkast songs.

Track listing
 CD Single
 "ATLiens" (Album Version) – 3:50
 "Wheelz of Steel" (Album Version) – 4:03

 Maxi Single
 "ATLiens" (Album Version) – 3:50
 "Wheelz of Steel" (Album Version) – 4:03
 "ATLiens" (Instrumental) – 3:50
 "Wheelz of Steel" (Instrumental) – 4:03

 Atliens - Remix CD Single
 "ATLiens" (Bad Boy Remix) – 6:15
 "ATLiens" (Bad Boy Instrumental) – 6:15
 "ATLiens" (Bad Boy Alternative Mix) – 5:08
 "Wheelz of Steel" (Remix) – 4:16

 12" Vinyl Single
 "ATLiens" (Clean Version) – 3:50
 "ATLiens" (Album Version) – 3:50
 "ATLiens" (Album Instrumental) – 3:50
 "ATLiens" (Album Acapella) – 3:58
 "Wheelz of Steel" (Clean Version) – 4:03
 "Wheelz of Steel" (Album Version) – 4:03
 "Wheelz of Steel" (Album Instrumental) – 4:03
 "Wheelz of Steel" (Album Acapella) – 4:12

Charts

References

1996 singles
1996 songs
Outkast songs
LaFace Records singles
Songs written by Big Boi
Songs written by André 3000
RCA Records singles